The 1918 Tullamore by-election was held on 19 April 1918.  The by-election was held due to the death of the incumbent Independent Nationalist MP, Edward John Graham.  It was won by the Sinn Féin candidate Patrick McCartan, who stood unopposed.

McCartan had previously contested the by-election in South Armagh for Sinn Féin but lost out to the Irish Parliamentary Party candidate. He was subsequently elected for the merged King's County constituency in the 1918 general election.

References

Tullamore, County Offaly
1918 elections in the United Kingdom
By-elections to the Parliament of the United Kingdom in King's County constituencies
Unopposed by-elections to the Parliament of the United Kingdom in Irish constituencies
1918 elections in Ireland